Anacapa may refer to:

Anacapa Island, an island near the coast of California
Anacapa Island Lighthouse, a lighthouse on Anacapa Island
, a World War II Q-ship of the US Navy
, an active cutter of the US Coast Guard